Derek Arnold Ridgewell (9 May 1945 in King's Park, Glasgow — 1982) was a former British Transport Police officer who was involved with a series of arrests followed by court cases in which it was later found that he had framed innocent people,  and was eventually jailed for mail theft. Several of those convicted by courts based on Ridgewell's false testimony, including the Oval Four and the Stockwell Six, had their convictions quashed decades later. Ridgewell died in prison in 1982.

Previous police career
Ridgewell had been in the police force of Southern Rhodesia.

Modus operandi
Ridgewell's customary behaviour was to dress in plain clothes and confront young black men, falsely accusing them of robbing people. If they resisted arrest, he would assault them. He would make up false confessions and then testify at the Old Bailey.

Tottenham Court Road Two
Two young men were arrested at Tottenham Court Road tube station in 1973 and went on trial later that year. They were devout Jesuit students from Oxford University and the judge halted the trial, saying "I find it terrible that here in London people using public transport should be pounced upon by police officers without a word."

After the trial, Ridgewell was moved from the underground squad to the mail theft unit. He was then moved into a department investigating mailbag theft where he conspired with two criminals to split material stolen from mailbags. He hid the profits of his crimes in five bank accounts, one in Zurich and a bank deposit box.

Conviction
Ridgewell was eventually arrested and convicted of conspiracy to rob and jailed for seven years in 1980. He stole over  Although his rank was low, detective sergeant, he owned property and businesses.

The governor of HM Prison Ford asked him why he had embarked on a life of crime to which he replied "I just went bent". He died in prison in 1982, reportedly of a heart attack, possibly murdered, aged 37.

In November 2021, Lucy D'Orsi, the British Transport Police chief constable, apologised to the black community in the United Kingdom "for the trauma suffered by the British African community through the criminal actions" of Ridgewell, adding that "In particular, it is of regret that we did not act sooner to end his criminalisation of British Africans, which led to the conviction of innocent people".

Overturned convictions

Stephen Simmons
Three young white men including Stephen Simmons were in a car in Clapham in June 1975 when they were approached by Ridgewell and two other officers, who questioned them about stolen mailbags. At trial all three pleaded not guilty, but were convicted. Simmons was sent to Borstal in Hollesley Bay to serve eight months. He lost his job and flat, and subsequently suffered from chronic ill health. One of his co-defendants later became an alcoholic and died.

In 2013 Simmons was listening to a radio programme about legal matters in which a barrister answered questions. Simmons rang the programme to ask about his situation; the barrister suggested he make a Google search for the name of his arresting officer, which revealed Ridgewell's conviction. Simmons took his case to the Criminal Cases Review Commission, which carried out meticulous research leading to Simmons's 2018 appeal, which overturned his conviction. It also emerged in court that Ridgewell had been responsible for several cases in which young black men were falsely accused of "mugging" on the London Underground.

Simmons said after his conviction was quashed: "This is one of the happiest days of my life, It has hardly sunk in but I am not a criminal any more. I can hold my head up high. One of the hardest things for me was that my parents did not believe me because they were of the generation that believed that the police could not lie.". Of Ridgewell he said "Ridgewell ruined three lives for no reason and I am sure many, many more ... if this can help someone else who was also arrested by him then at least something will have been achieved."

Winston Trew of the Oval Four embraced Simmons after the acquittal and said "today is a great day. This opens the door for me to present my case. It means that evidence that Ridgewell gave in our trial is as tainted as in Stephen's case."

Oval Four

The Oval Four are four men—Winston Trew, Sterling Christie, George Griffiths and Constantine "Omar" Boucher—who were arrested by police at Oval tube station in March 1972 accused of stealing passengers' handbags. The four were held overnight, and their trial eventually lasted five weeks. They were all found guilty of assaulting police officers and attempted theft in November 1972 and were sentenced to two years in prison. Following an appeal led by John Platts-Mills QC, their sentences were reduced to eight months, although the convictions were upheld, and Lord Justice Haymes commented that the reduction did not ameliorate the seriousness of their crimes. Christie was also convicted of stealing a female police officer's handbag.

Their convictions were overturned in 2019 and 2020.

Stockwell Six

The Stockwell Six are a group of young black British men who were put on trial for attempted robbery in 1972. Five of them, now in their late 60s, were convicted and sent to jail or borstal, but in 2021 the convictions for four of them—who had been released long ago after serving sentences—were overturned; the other could not be traced.

References

Further reading

 A book about Ridgewell's crimes by Trew, one of his victims, and Satchwell, a former detective.

British police officers convicted of crimes
1982 deaths
Year of birth unknown
People convicted of theft
Police misconduct in the United Kingdom
Police corruption
British South Africa Police officers